The Los Robles Archaeological District is located in Arizona's Ironwood Forest National Monument and was added to the National Register of Historic Places on May 11, 1989. The district is nearly 13,000 acres and contains over 100 historic and prehistoric archaeological sites, including the Los Robles Platform Mound Community and a trincheras.

In 2003, George H. Johnson and his Johnson International Inc. illegally bulldozed 270 acres of state trust land in and near Los Robles, causing an estimated $8,000,000 in damage. Several sites were completely destroyed, including areas within the Los Robles Platform Mound Community. In addition, Johnson International Inc. destroyed over 40,000 protected plants, contaminated local water sources by illegally dumping pollutants, and was responsible for the deaths of at least twenty-one endangered Desert bighorn sheep, and the injury of several others.

See also

 Cocoraque Butte Archaeological District
 Santa Ana del Chiquiburitac Mission Site
 National Register of Historic Places listings in Pima County, Arizona

References

Archaeological sites in Arizona
Archaeological sites on the National Register of Historic Places in Arizona
Hohokam trincheras sites
Buildings and structures in Pima County, Arizona
Buildings and structures in Pinal County, Arizona
History of Pima County, Arizona
1989 establishments in Arizona
Protected areas of Arizona
Protected areas of the Sonoran Desert
National Register of Historic Places in Pima County, Arizona